The Battle of Cabeza de Las Marías and Las Hicoteas were the first military engagements of the Dominican War of Independence and were fought between the 13 and 18 March 1844, at Cabeza de Las Marías, near Neyba, Baoruco Province and Las Hicoteas, near Azua de Compostela, Azua Province. A force of 500 Dominican troops, a portion of the Army of the South, led by General Manuel de Regla Mota, encountered an outnumbering force of 10,000 troops of the Haitian Army led by General Souffrand and was forced to flee to Azua de Compostela.

References

Bibliography
 
 

Conflicts in 1844
Cabeza de Las Marías
Cabeza de Las Marías
1844 in the Dominican Republic
March 1844 events